The Ministry of Education is a department of the government of Bahrain. It is responsible for the government-operated schools.

 Majid bin Ali Al-Naimi is the minister.

Higher Education Council
Higher Education Council (HEC), the agency which regulates tertiary institutions, was established in 2005.

Schools
Public government-funded schools are segregated based on gender.

See also
 Education in Bahrain
Quality Assurance Authority for Education and Training

References

External links
 Ministry of Education
 Ministry of Education 
 
Government of Bahrain
Education in Bahrain
Bahrain